Fred Cash (born October 8, 1940) is an American soul singer. He was a member of The Impressions, a group in which he replaced Jerry Butler in 1960. As one of the group's longest-serving members, he is also a 1991 inductee into the Rock and Roll Hall of Fame with The Impressions. In 2016 Cash along with The Impressions were inducted into the National Rhythm & Blues Hall of Fame.
Cash was an original member of the Roosters, the group that later evolved into The Impressions. After leaving the group for a time, he returned, replacing original member Jerry Butler. He continues to tour with the group. He can be seen with original Impressions members Sam Gooden and the late Curtis Mayfield (via archive footage) in the group's first-ever extended interview in the 2008 DVD "Movin On Up- The Message and The Music of Curtis Mayfield & The Impressions" .

External links
Movin On Up- The Music and Message of Curtis Mayfield and The Impressions DVD –  2008

1940 births
Living people
People from Chattanooga, Tennessee
African-American musicians
American soul musicians
The Impressions members
21st-century African-American people
20th-century African-American people